Gianna Nannini is the first album released by Gianna Nannini in 1976.

Track listing
All songs by Gianna Nannini.

"Come Un Angelo" - 4:02
"Storia Di Un Sorriso" - 3:42
"E Poi Viaggiai" - 3:52
"Un'Anima Di Sughero" - 4:13
"Addio" - 4:06
"Ti Avevo Chiesto Solo Di Toccarmi" - 4:27
"Fantasia" - 4:27
"Ma Lasciati Andare" - 3:27
""Morta Per Autoprocurato Aborto"" - 3:25
"Il Pastore" - 3:35

Personnel 
Gianna Nannini - vocals, piano
Massimo Luca - acoustic guitar
Claudio Fabi - keyboards, synth, production
Paolo Donnarumma - bass
Claudio Bazzari - guitar
Gianni Dall'Aglio - drums
Luigi Mucciolo - flicorno
Claudio Pascoli - sax 
Piero Dosso - bassoon
Stefano Montanari - English corn

External links
 Gianna Nannini homepage

1976 debut albums
Gianna Nannini albums